Rietavas (Samogitian: Rėitavs) is a city in Lithuania on the Jūra River. According to the 2001 census it had a population of 3,979. It is the capital of Rietavas municipality.

The city is famous for building the first power station to produce electricity in Lithuania in 1892. The first telephone line in Lithuania was also built here.

History

Rietavas was first mentioned in written sources around 1253. During the Middle Ages it belonged to Ceklis land. Rietavas' eldership was mentioned in 1527. Since 1533 Rietavas was known as a city however the city rights were not granted until 1792. In the 14th and 15th centuries Rietavas was one of the most important defence centres in Samogitia and also a crossing of commercial roads.

In the 19th century Rietavas was an important educational centre whereas in 1812–1909 it belonged to Ogiński family who loved culture and education. In 1835 there was established a hospital and four year later school of parish. In 1859 the school of agriculture was established in Rietavas which was closed in 1863. Lithuanian was the official language of this school (there were any other such schools where Lithuanian would be an official language at that time). In 1873 current Catholic Church reflecting features of Romanesque Revival architecture was built.

Rietavas also became an important centre of progressive technologies of that time. In 1882 the first telephone line in Lithuania was built. It connected Rietavas and Plungė cities. In 1892 started to produce electricity the first power station in Lithuania. On 17 April 1892 in Easter the first street lights were turned on in Rietavas manor, park and church.

In 1915 Rietavas was the centre of the county and later on centre of the eldership. During the Inter-war period there were established a public library in 1928, a cinema in 1931.

During World War II, the Jewish Community was entirely destroyed by the Nazis and their Lithuanian collaborators. The Jews of Rietavas dealt in trade and crafts and provided their labor as plasterers, carpenters and blacksmiths. The first known census of the Jews in Rietavas was in 1662, when they numbered 421. Rietavas reached the zenith of its Jewish population around the end of the 19th century. In the 1897 census the total population numbered 1,750 of which 1,397 were Jewish. In 1882, Tsar Alexander III published legislation that restricted Jewish residence in the Russian Empire to small towns and villages, making farming impossible for the Jews in the rural areas or industry in the cities. This led to Jewish emigration, particularly to South Africa. In 1923, there 868 Jews out of a total population of 1,720. By 1940 there were 500 Jews. During WWII, in 1941, the local Jewish population were subjected to forced labor and then murdered in mass executions
In 1959 when the total population had grown to 2,882, there was only one Jew left in the town.
After the World War II Rietavas became the centre of district municipality however in 1963 it was merged with Plungė district municipality. Nevertheless, Rietavas retrieved its municipality in 2000.

The coat of arms of Rietavas was approved by the decree of the President in 1996.

Notable people
Laurynas Ivinskis - Lithuanian teacher, publisher, translator and lexicographer.
Diana Žiliūtė - Lithuanian racing cyclist, olympic medalist.
Susman Brothers - businessmen in Rhodesia

Twin towns – sister cities

Rietavas is twinned with:
 Gulbene, Latvia
 Kętrzyn (rural gmina), Poland
 Saerbeck, Germany

References

External links

Rietavas homepage 

 
Cities in Telšiai County
Cities in Lithuania
Rietavas Municipality
Municipalities administrative centres of Lithuania
Rossiyensky Uyezd
Holocaust locations in Lithuania